Presidential elections were held in Brazil in 1989, with the first round on November 15 and a second round on December 17. They were the first direct presidential elections since 1960, the first to be held using a two-round system and the first to take place under the 1988 constitution, which followed two decades of authoritarian rule after the 1964 Brazilian coup d'état.

The collapse of the military junta-imposed two-party system that pitted the right-wing authoritarian National Renewal Alliance (ARENA) against the catch-all Brazilian Democratic Movement (MDB) resulted in a wide array of new parties seeking to fill the political vacuum. President José Sarney of the PMDB, the MBD's successor, was ineligible to run. Sarney, who was elected Vice President on Tancredo Neves's ticket in the 1985 elections, had taken office due to Neves's death before his scheduled inauguration.

Popular Governor of Alagoas Fernando Collor de Mello resigned from his position to mount a bid for the presidency. Previously a member of the PMDB, Collor joined the small National Reconstruction Party (PRN) in the run-up to the presidential campaign. Collor, who presented himself as a political outsider and was noted for his charisma, polled at a mere 5% according to polling taken in early 1989. Collor's emergence as an unlikely frontrunner was credited to his campaign's skilled use of television advertisements to make the case for his candidacy. Collor, who had governed one of the smallest states in the country, chose Senator Itamar Franco of the populous and electorally crucial state of Minas Gerais as his running mate. Further, Collor's campaign was noted for his relative youth at the mere age of 40.

Following the end of state repression of socialist parties, the Brazilian Left faced a fractured field defined by two primary candidates: Popular labor leader Luiz Inácio Lula da Silva, known as Lula, of the industrial ABC Region of São Paulo, and Leonel Brizola, a longtime staple of the Brazilian Left who had served as Governor of Rio Grande do Sul prior to the 1964 military coup. Lula was widely known in Brazil for his role leading the highly publicized metalworkers' strike in the State of São Paulo during the late 1970s and had been elected a federal deputy in 1986 with the most votes nationwide. Lula ran as a member of the Workers' Party (PT), a left-wing party he helped found in 1980. For his running mate, Lula chose Senator José Paulo Bisol of Rio Grande do Sul, a member of the Brazilian Socialist Party (PSB), to unite the left. In the first round, Lula narrowly defeated Brizola, who was running as a member of the Brazilian Labour Party (PDT), for a position in the runoff.

The general election was marked by negative campaigning, with Collor accusing Lula of supporting divisive class struggle. The role of popular commercial television Rede Globo in Collor's election remains controversial; in 2009 Collor admitted that the network favored his candidacy over Lula's. The kidnapping of wealthy businessman Abilio Diniz on the day of the election by alleged supporters of the PT is believed to have harmed Lula, who was legally forbidden from speaking to the press on election day to disavow the crime due to Brazilian election rules. Following a tumultuous election cycle, Collor defeated Lula to become the first democratically-elected President of Brazil in almost thirty years. Collor would later resign from office in the face of an impeachment trial. This was also the last election where the incumbent did not serve one term until 2022, when Lula (who lost this election) defeated incumbent Jair Bolsonaro.

Background
On January 15, 1985, following two decades of a US-backed right-wing military dictatorship, in power since the 1964 Brazilian coup d'état, Tancredo Neves of the Brazilian Democratic Movement, the opposition party in a military junta-imposed two-party system, was indirectly elected president by Congress. The government was an authoritarian illiberal democracy which directly elected representatives, but not the president. It was in a process of slow liberalization since the 1974 indirect election of Ernesto Geisel, who was more permissive of political dissent than his hard-liner predecessor, Emílio Garrastazu Médici. Neves was the first civilian to be elected president since 1960.

However, Neves was hospitalized of an untreated cancer on the eve of his inauguration, and finally died in 21 April, before taking office. José Sarney, the Vice-President-elect, was immediately sworn in. The legitimacy of Sarney's appointment was widely questioned, since Neves had died as president-elect without ever taking office. Sarney was seen with suspicion by the civilian population as a member of the military regime's party, the National Renewal Alliance.  The support of General Leônidas Pires Gonçalves, slated to be Minister of the Army in Neves' future cabinet, was decisive for Sarney taking office.

Though Leonel Brizola was disappointed by his defeat in the first round, he wholeheartedly supported Lula in the second round, with his support being considered crucial to Lula's strong performance in Rio Grande do Sul and Brizola's adopted home state of Rio de Janeiro.

Nevertheless, as promised by Neves, Sarney led a transitional government which allowed for liberalization of the authoritarian military government. In 1986, he called for elections to form a constituent assembly, which designed and promulgated the seventh and current constitution of Brazil on October 5, 1988. A markedly liberal democratic and social democratic constitution, it prescribed first-past-the-post two-round direct elections for executive and legislative seats at the federal, state, and municipal levels, and set the date for the 1989 election. It also provided for freedom of expression and legalized formerly clandestine parties such as the Brazilian Communist Party and the Brazilian Socialist Party.

Candidates

Candidates in the runoff

Candidates failing to make the runoff

Campaign
Most political parties were relatively new but managed to actively mobilise the population, with the election coming five years after massive demonstrations for direct elections in the late 1980s Diretas Já movement had called for the end of the military regime. Sarney was barred by the 1988 constitution from running for immediate reelection in his own right. Twenty-two candidates entered the race, a record number of candidates in a single presidential election. The 1989 elections were the first in which the president and vice-president were jointly elected as running mates.

Among the twenty-two candidates, only Ulysses Guimarães and Paulo Maluf had previously run for the presidency, although Jânio Quadros planned to run but eventually dropped his candidacy. Aureliano Chaves had also previously served as vice-president. Orestes Quercia, a member of Sarney's Brazilian Democratic Movement, led the polls until he decided to drop out of the contest. TV host Silvio Santos announced he would run just 20 days before the election, but his candidacy was mired in uncertainty and eventually revoked by the Superior Electoral Court because of a technicality.

The first round took place on November 15, 1989, the 100th anniversary of the republican coup which deposed Pedro II of Brazil and proclaimed the First Brazilian Republic. Since no candidate managed to win a majority of votes, a second round was held on December 17, featuring the two top finishers: Fernando Collor de Mello of the economically liberal right-wing populist National Reconstruction Party and Luiz Inácio Lula da Silva of the social democratic left-wing populist Workers' Party. Collor was elected with a 6-point lead.

Both candidates had a reputation as outsiders. Despite being a charismatic leader, Lula failed to attract the majority of votes from poor, unskilled and semiskilled workers – who would, later on, form the basis of the Workers' Party electorate. These voters predominantly favored Collor, who was associated with the traditional economic elites of northeastern Brazil. Lula's support was greater among progressive intellectuals, Catholic activists, skilled industrial workers, and the college-educated middle class of the South and Southeast, despite himself being a poor immigrant from the Northeast.

Collor argued that Lula's plans of aggressive spending on inequality reduction programs would destroy Brazil's then-fragile economy, harming the poor people he claimed to champion. He also appealed to his young age and distanced himself from the previous  military governments, as well as from the newer political elites who had supported the Sarney government and its Plano Cruzado, which had failed to stop hyperinflation. His strong rhetoric against corruption gained widespread support, which quickly vanished in the wake of his 1992 impeachment for corruption charges.

Lula would go on to be elected president in the 2002 elections and to win a second term in the 2006 contest. The Workers' Party also won the presidency twice more with Dilma Rousseff, a protégé of Lula, in the 2010 and 2014 elections. The party would remain in power until her impeachment in 2016 and the 2018 election of right-wing populist Jair Bolsonaro.

Debates

First round
Following the first round, Rede Globo aired a debate between Lula and Collor live. During the broadcast of primetime news program Jornal Nacional on the following day, an edited-down highlight reel of the debate was aired. Critics argued that it highlighted Collor's best moments and Lula's worst ones, and that coverage was sympathetical to Collor, who was supposedly close to Globo's CEO Roberto Marinho. The event was explored on the British Channel 4 documentary Beyond Citizen Kane, which features an interview with then head of journalism at Globo, Armando Nogueira, where he says his edit of the debate was edited so as to favor Collor and claims that after complaining to Marinho about the edit, he was dismissed from the company.

Some attribute Collor's electoral victory to this particular event and other media coverage, such as a Jornal do Brasil article claiming Lula had fathered an illegitimate daughter. Later, Collor's campaign contacted Lula's ex-girlfriend, the mother of the child in question, and claimed that Lula had asked her to perform an abortion. This is said to be compounded by a prohibition on electoral advertising immediately preceding an election, which prevented Lula from responding to the accusations.

Second round

Opinion polls

First round

Second round

Results
Fernando Collor received the most votes in most states, except for the Federal District, where Lula came first, and Rio de Janeiro, Santa Catarina and Rio Grande do Sul, won by Leonel Brizola. In the second round, Lula won Rio Grande do Sul, Santa Catarina, Rio de Janeiro, the Federal District, and his home state of Pernambuco, whilst Collor won the most votes in every other state.

Notes

References

External links
"The Presidential Election of 1989" by U.S. Library of Congress
"Electoral Geography 2.0 - Brazilian Presidential Election 1989" (votes by state)
"Brazil 1989 Presidential Election"
A case study on 1989 Brazilian presidential elections, The University of Oxford

Brazil
President
Presidential elections in Brazil
November 1989 events in South America